Laugardalur is a district of Reykjavík, the capital of Iceland. It is just east of the city centre and contains various recreational facilities including the main stadium. The name means "hot spring valley" (literally translates to "pool valley"), as washing laundry was once done in geothermal hot springs there until the 1930s.

See also
 Reykjavík Botanic Garden

References

External links

Districts of Reykjavík